The Swedish Women's Voluntary Defence Organization Medal of Merit (SLKgm/sm) is a medal awarded by the Swedish Women's Voluntary Defence Organization since 1944 (silver) and 1967 (gold) for personal effort which has been useful for the organization through extraordinarily meritorious activities.

History
The Swedish Women's Voluntary Defence Organization Royal Medal of Merit in silver was established in 1944 and the one in gold in 1967.

Appearance

Medal
The gold medal is embossed in gilded metal and the silver medal in silver-plated metal in the eighth size. The obverse of the medal is provided with the organization's emblem and the reverse with the inscription Förtjänster om Sveriges Lottaorganisation ("Merits about the Swedish Women's Voluntary Defence Organization").

Ribbon
The ribbon for the gold medal is divided in grey, blue, yellow, blue and grey moiré pattern and the silver medal divided in grey, blue, grey, blue and grey moiré.

Criteria

General criteria
Medals are preferably awarded to members of the organization. The medal can also be awarded to Swedish citizens who is not a member as a reward for many years of meritorious efforts for the benefit of the organization. Examples are unit commanders, instructors, representatives of the Home Guard or voluntary organizations and other executives within the Swedish Total Defence system with whom the organization collaborates. When examining the application for a non-member, consideration must be given to work initiatives for the organization and the commitment shown in addition to the collaboration commitments that may be included in the person's ordinary duties.

The first medal of merit is usually the Swedish Women's Voluntary Defence Organization Medal of Merit in silver. Exceptions can be made in accordance with current practice in the Swedish award system, in the opinion of the Chief of the Swedish Women's Voluntary Defence Organization. Thus, the Swedish Women's Voluntary Defence Organization Medal of Merit in gold and the Swedish Women's Voluntary Defence Organization Royal Medal of Merit in silver can in individual cases be the first medal of merit. The first medal of merit can be awarded after four years of effort. For non-members, a candidate with a shorter time may be considered.

Gold medal
Can be awarded to Swedish citizens who, through very great personal effort, have benefited the Swedish Women's Voluntary Defence Organization through extraordinarily meritorious activities, usually for at least 7 years.

Silver medal
Can be awarded to Swedish citizens who, through very great personal effort, have benefited the Swedish Women's Voluntary Defence Organization through extraordinarily meritorious activities, usually for at least 4 years.

Presenting
The gold and silver medal is awarded at union meetings.

See also
Swedish Women's Voluntary Defence Organization Royal Medal of Merit

Footnotes

References

Notes

Print

Orders, decorations, and medals of Sweden
Awards established in 1944
1944 establishments in Sweden
Awards established in 1967
1967 establishments in Sweden